The Tazewell County Courthouse, located on Court Street in Pekin, is the county courthouse serving Tazewell County, Illinois. The courthouse was built in 1914 to provide a larger space for county government, which had outgrown the previous courthouse and had begun to spread across multiple buildings. Lincoln, Illinois architects Deal & Ginzel designed the courthouse; the pair was also responsible for two other county courthouse designs in Illinois, in Moultrie County and Logan County. The firm designed the courthouse in the Beaux-Arts style; their design features an arched entrance and windows on the first floor, pavilions with Tuscan columns on the upper two stories, and an entablature and balustrade along the roof.

The courthouse was added to the National Register of Historic Places on November 14, 1985.

References

Courthouses on the National Register of Historic Places in Illinois
Beaux-Arts architecture in Illinois
Government buildings completed in 1914
National Register of Historic Places in Tazewell County, Illinois
County courthouses in Illinois
Pekin, Illinois